Narasapurapupeta is a village in Ramachandrapuram Mandal, East Godavari District, Andhra Pradesh.

References 

Villages in East Godavari district